The Fresno Unified School District is a school district in Fresno, California, United States.

Facts and figures
California's fourth largest school district
74,000 students
$1.6 Billion Budget
76 different languages represented over the last five years
1,575 children attend preschool
25,400 adults attend adult education classes

Administration

Superintendent
Robert G. Nelson

Board of Education
Elizabeth Jonasson Rosas, President
Veva Islas, Clerk
Valerie F. Davis
Keshia Thomas
Claudia Cazares
Andy Levine
Major Terry Slatic USMC (Retired)

Schools

High schools
Philip J. Patino High School of Entrepreneurship
Bullard High School
The Center for Advanced Research and Technology
Design Science High School
Duncan Polytechnical High School
Edison High School
Fresno High School
Hoover High School
McLane High School
Roosevelt High School
Sunnyside High School
University High School

Middle schools

Elementary schools

Other schools

Alternative schools
Cambridge Cont. High School
DeWolf Cont. High School
eLearn Academy
J.E. Young Academic Center
Phoenix Academy
Phoenix Secondary 

Adult schools
Cesar E. Chavez Adult School

Notable alumni 
 Henry Ellard (Hoover High School class of 1979) - NFL wide receiver, state champion in the triple jump
 Cliff Harris (Cooper Middle School Class of 2005) - award-winning college football player; played for the University of Oregon 2010-11
 John Hoover (Cooper Junior High School Class of 1977) - Olympian silver medalist; pro baseball player; Major League Baseball first round draft choice in 1984 by Baltimore 
 Eric Kendricks (Hoover High School class of 2010) - 2014 Dick Butkus Award winner
 Mychal Kendricks (Hoover High School class of 2008) - NFL linebacker for the Seattle Seahawks
 Barbara Morgan (Hoover High School class of 1969) - NASA astronaut; teacher in Space Project
 Rod Perry (Hoover High School class of 1971) - former NFL defensive back for the Los Angeles Rams

See also

List of school districts in Fresno County, California
Long Range School Site Location Plan: PROJECT DESIGN. Interagency Planning for Urban Educational Needs, Number 36

References

External links
Fresno Unified School District

School districts in Fresno County, California
Education in Fresno, California